"Conquer" is the sixteenth and final episode of the fifth season of the post-apocalyptic horror television series The Walking Dead, which aired on AMC on March 29, 2015. It was written by showrunner Scott M. Gimple and Seth Hoffman, and directed by Greg Nicotero.

Several recurring storylines culminate in the episode: the residents of the Alexandria Safe-Zone deciding on what to do with Rick Grimes (Andrew Lincoln) following his outburst in the previous episode; Glenn Rhee's (Steven Yeun) conflict with Nicholas (Michael Traynor); and Sasha Williams (Sonequa Martin-Green) and Father Gabriel Stokes (Seth Gilliam) confronting their demons. Meanwhile, Daryl Dixon (Norman Reedus) and Aaron (Ross Marquand) encounter trouble from a potential threat during a run, and Morgan Jones (Lennie James) nears the end of his search for Rick.

Similar to the pilot episode and the season two premiere, the episode aired in a 90-minute time slot, as opposed to its regular 60-minute time slot.

Television commentators lauded the character progression, its storytelling, Nicotero's direction, Gimple's and Hoffman's script and the ensemble's performances. Many highlighted Andrew Lincoln and Lennie James's performances, as well as the character progression of Carol Peletier. Upon airing, it attracted 15.8 million viewers with an 18-49 rating of 8.2, making it the most watched season finale in the show and drama in basic cable history.

This episode marks the last appearances of the recurring cast Corey Bill (Pete Anderson) and Steve Coulter (Reg Monroe), as their characters die at the end of the episode.

Plot
One morning, Morgan brews coffee in his camp when a man (Benedict Samuel) with a "W" written in his forehead approaches and holds him at gunpoint. He explains that he and his group, the Wolves, are hunting down other survivors and eliminating them. Morgan offers his supplies in exchange for being let go, but the Wolf refuses. Morgan evades another Wolf's attempt to ambush him and knocks both of them out with his walking stick.

In Alexandria, Rick regains consciousness after being knocked out by Michonne and is informed that Pete has been separated from Jessie, and Deanna is holding a forum to decide whether Rick should be exiled. Maggie tries to talk Deanna out of it, but is unsuccessful.

Outside the walls, Sasha buries a group of walkers she had killed. However, still emotionally unstable, she goes into the grave and lies among the pile of corpses. Elsewhere outside the wall Daryl and Aaron see a survivor wearing a red poncho (Jason Alexander Davis) in the forest, but lose track of him, and decide to scavenge supplies from a food truck. However, they set off a trap that unleashes a horde of walkers and are forced to take shelter inside a car.

Tensions continue to rise between the outsiders and members of the community. Carol visits Pete and asks him to check on Tara, who is still wounded. When he refuses, Carol pulls a knife and threatens him, saying that she can get away with claiming self-defense. Elsewhere, Glenn sees Nicholas climbing over the wall and follows him into the woods. While tracking him, Glenn is shot and wounded by Nicholas.

Back at the car, Morgan arrives and Daryl and Aaron are able to escape. Aaron invites Morgan to Alexandria, but Morgan declines, asking instead for directions and shows them the map he picked up in the church. As Daryl looks at the directions he sees Abraham's handwritten note to Rick, recognizing Morgan as a friend.

Back at Alexandria, Gabriel goes outside the walls, unarmed. He finds a walker eating a man and approaches, offering himself to the walker, but he ends up killing both the walker and the dying man. Upon returning to Alexandria, Gabriel leaves the front gate ajar. Inside the walls, Abraham visits Tara and talks with Eugene, and they apologize for things that happened on the road. Eventually, Tara wakes up while Rosita is watching her. Rick admits to Michonne that he and Carol stole guns from the armory and tries to return the gun, but Michonne says she would not have stopped him, and that she knocked out Rick to protect him, not Alexandria. On his way to the meeting, Rick notices the front gate open. He closes it and follows a trail of blood to find walkers amongst the houses, while the town meeting begins, with Michonne, Carol, Abraham, and Maggie speaking in Rick's defense.

In the woods, Glenn escapes and tackles Nicholas when his attention is focused on a lone walker. A struggle ensues and Nicholas runs off, leaving Glenn to defend himself against the walkers they attracted. As Nicholas moves through the night, Glenn catches up and holds him at gunpoint. Nicholas begs for his life, and Glenn reluctantly spares him.

Sasha goes to the church and asks Gabriel for help, but he says he cannot help her. Sasha admits she wants to die, and Gabriel, in a fit of anger, blames Bob and Tyreese's deaths on her sins. A struggle ensues and Sasha holds Gabriel at gunpoint. Gabriel tells her to shoot him but Maggie arrives and stops her. Maggie hears Gabriel's confession over letting his congregation die and helps him to his feet.

Meanwhile, back at the trap, the two Wolves Morgan previously encountered bring the survivor with the red poncho to the location, only to find their trap triggered, and they slit his throat. While resetting the trap, the Wolves find Aaron's dropped pack, containing evidence of Alexandria's existence.

As the meeting comes to a head, Deanna reveals Gabriel's claims. Rick then arrives with a walker corpse, saying the walls alone are not enough to keep the residents safe. An inebriated Pete shows up wielding Michonne's katana, angrily proclaiming that Rick does not belong in Alexandria while attempting to kill him. Reg tries to stop Pete, but Pete shoves Reg away and accidentally slices open his throat with the katana, for which Abraham pins him down afterward. At Deanna's request, Rick executes Pete. He looks up to find that Daryl and Aaron have returned with Morgan, who all witnessed the execution.

In a post-credits scene, Michonne contemplates mounting her katana back on the wall but decides to carry it. At the Wolves' trap, the red poncho survivor, now a walker, stumbles past the car in which Daryl and Aaron had taken shelter, upon which has been written "WOLVES NOT FAR".

Production

"Conquer" was co-written by executive producer and series showrunner Scott M. Gimple and co-executive producer Seth Hoffman. It was directed by executive producer and special make-up effects supervisor Greg Nicotero.

The episode featured Lennie James as Morgan Jones prominently, his fifth guest appearance on the television series. It marks his third appearance in the fifth season, after two brief, post-credit cameo appearances in "No Sanctuary" and "Coda", which showed Morgan on the trail after leaving his base in the third season episode "Clear". A cover version of Brian Wilson's 1988 song "Love and Mercy" plays during one scene. It was recorded by Gazelle Twin specifically for the episode.

Reception

Ratings
Upon airing, the episode was watched by 15.8 million American viewers with an 18-49 rating of 8.2, an increase in viewership from the previous episode which had 13.757 million viewers with an 18-49 rating of 7.0. This made the episode the highest rated season finale in the show's history, beating last season's finale, which had a 7.6 18-49 rating. Including DVR viewership, the episode was watched by 21.43 million viewers with an 18-49 rating of 11.1.

Critical reception

"Conquer" received critical acclaim. Critics praised the reintroduction of Lennie James as Morgan Jones into the main story. Other critics complimented the performances of James, as well as Andrew Lincoln and Tovah Feldshuh as well as the script. The scenes involving Seth Gilliam, Sonequa Martin-Green and Steven Yeun were noted as highlights. Greg Nicotero's direction was praised with many being complimentary of the shot of Sasha lying on a herd of walkers in a graveyard, as well as the scene involving Daryl and Aaron hiding in a car surrounded by hundreds of zombies. Den of Geek!s Ron Hogan said "Nicotero has been killing it [...] this season, and this brilliantly conceived movie-length episode is a testament to his abilities behind the camera." He also felt the performances of the actors were a strong point in the episode, saying "everyone raises their game" as well as noting the series has "never been better" in its fifth season run.

Some continued to assess the fifth season as the strongest. Varietys Laura Prudom called it "arguably [...] The Walking Deads best [season] yet, propelled by compulsive story threads and fascinating character dynamics" as she commented on the episode as a whole saying: "The weight of so many competing story arcs certainly brought a breathless quality to the finale — similar to Game of Thrones and that blockbuster show’s sprawling ensemble, each character probably got a cumulative five minutes of screen time while showrunner Scott Gimple worked to tie up multiple loose ends." She also declared that Morgan's presence dominated the episode.

The Guardians Bryan Moylan declared it "a season finale that had everything." He said: "In bravura style, this shocking season finale showed Rick confronting the people of Alexandria, and perfectly set up a very creepy season six." He praised the ending with "the action [...] cutting between four life-or-death confrontations. Rick was fighting off the three zombies that had been let into Alexandria; Sasha was fending off Gabriel; Glenn was beating the snot out of Nicholas; and Carol, Michonne, and the rest of the group were defending Rick from Deanna." He assessed "And that is what makes this show so great. It resolved all the storylines it had been juggling all season, but not without some moral and emotional ambiguity. And it took the time to direct us towards what we can expect when the show returns. There is resolution, but there is still impending doom. There is never any rest on The Walking Dead, and I can’t wait for its return.

Erik Kain for Forbes praised the episode, inferring it to be unpredictable and "one of the most tense and anxious episodes of The Walking Dead". Both TheWrap and Us Weekly felt the season finale delivered an explosive and action packed climax.

References

External links

"Conquer" at AMC

2015 American television episodes
The Walking Dead (season 5) episodes